The Sunset Tunnel, originally known as the Duboce Tunnel, is a -long light rail/streetcar tunnel in San Francisco, California. The tunnel runs under the steep hill adjacent to Buena Vista Park and is used exclusively by the N Judah Muni Metro line.

The eastern entrance is located at Duboce and Noe streets on the south side of Duboce Park in the Duboce Triangle neighborhood, and the western portal is located in Richard Gamble Memorial Park near the intersection of Carl and Cole streets in the Cole Valley neighborhood.

History

Initial proposals
Bion J. Arnold proposed a Mission–Sunset Tunnel in his Report on the Improvement and Development of the Transportation Facilities of San Francisco of March 1913. In Arnold's scheme, the Mission–Sunset Tunnel would start at Eureka Valley station, which was proposed as the transfer station for passengers needing service through the Twin Peaks Tunnel. The Mission–Sunset Tunnel would serve as a feeder bringing rail, automobile, and pedestrian traffic from the Panhandle region to the planned Market Street Subway. It would also improve service to the Sunset District from the Mission and other areas south of Market, as existing routes were circuitous or limited.

Arnold's plan called for a two-level tunnel, with a road and pedestrian tunnel similar in cross-section to the Stockton Street Tunnel above a two-track rail tunnel. Depending on the planned alignment and portal locations, the length of the Mission–Sunset Tunnel proposed by Arnold would have been .

However, further work on a tunnel to the Sunset District was postponed in favor of completing the Twin Peaks Tunnel, which opened to revenue service in June 1918. Soon afterwards, in July 1918, a Sunset Tunnel alignment matching the as-completed route along Duboce Avenue was proposed.

After the San Francisco Board of Supervisors appropriated funds for a tunnel into the Sunset in September 1921, City Engineer M.M. O'Shaughnessy was tasked with recommending a final alignment. He considered four routes, of which two relied on surface routes (one of these would run north from Laguna Honda), one was based on Arnold's 1913 proposed routing from the Eureka Valley station, and one matched the proposed Duboce route from 1918; of these four, O'Shaughnessy preferred the Duboce route as noted in a November 1921 Board meeting. The Board approved the Duboce alignment in a resolution passed on May 31, 1922 which also established the special assessment district. The route was opposed by several supervisors, who favored surface routes, but those were over the objections of Sunset residents, who preferred "the shorter and most direct [Duboce] route".

Construction and opening
Funds for test bores were set aside in June 1922 and the City Engineer's report, including detailed plans and estimated costs, were filed three months later in September. The final route was not approved until April 6, 1925, due to "protracted political discussion."

The tunnel was constructed using three drifts: a pilot drift at the crown, and two at the side walls. The pilot drift was accelerated in order to provide ventilation and to explore the geologic formations, and that crown drift was "holed-through" less than a year after groundbreaking, on March 11, 1927. After the tunnel was nearly complete, a contract was awarded to build the rail line, but work was halted under an injunction that lasted from October 1927 to May 1928.

The tunnel was opened for revenue service on October 21, 1928 in a ceremony presided over by Mayor James Rolph. The new "N" line recorded the second-highest gross revenues of all streetcar lines shortly after opening. Both the Twin Peaks and Sunset tunnels were credited with spurring development in the Sunset District, with many of the homes built by Henry Doelger in the 1930s and 1940s.

Intrusion
Access to the tunnel is restricted to San Francisco Municipal Railway light rail trains only. Despite the access limitations, this tunnel is not well protected, and has been vandalized, copper cable has been stolen, and graffiti has been painted on the surfaces. From time to time, automobile drivers manage to drive their cars into the tunnel, including four separate incidents in February 2017 alone.

Trackway Improvement Project
The Sunset Tunnel Trackway Improvement Project replaced tracks and repaired key equipment inside the tunnel, including a new overhead contact system, fire sprinkler valve refurbishment, seismic upgrades, and rebuilt platforms at 28th Avenue. The work, which started in November 2014, was originally planned to finish by June 2015, but was not completed until October 2017. During some weekends, the tunnel was closed and N Judah was short-turned at Church & Duboce. Buses were used to continue service to Ocean Beach. A combination of additional needed work that was discovered during construction, plus nearby residents challenging a night work permit, resulted in delays to the project and an additional $4 million cost for a total of $23.3 million.

References

External links

 
 
 . Video showing N Judah train towing Toyota Prius out of Sunset Tunnel.

Muni Metro
Railroad tunnels in California
Tunnels in San Francisco
Tunnels completed in 1928
Sunset District, San Francisco
Western Addition, San Francisco